The 2016–17 LEB Oro season will be the 21st season of the Spanish basketball second league LEB Oro. Dates must be determined yet.

Teams
On 20 July 2016 the Spanish Basketball Federation confirmed the expansion of the league to 18 teams. The 2010–11 season was the last one with this number.

Despite its promotion, on 23 July 2016 Sáenz Horeca Araberri Basket announced that it could not fulfill the requirements in the league. However, almost one month later the club was allowed to participate in the league.

Promotion and relegation (pre-season)

Teams relegated from the 2015–16 Liga ACB
Movistar Estudiantes (will play in ACB as Quesos Cerrato Palencia resigned to promote due to the impossibility to fulfill the requirements)
RETAbet.es GBC

Teams promoted from the 2015–16 LEB Plata
Marín Peixegalego
Sáenz Horeca Araberri Basket

Teams promoted after the expansion of the league
Actel Força Lleida (was relegated in the previous season)

Venues and locations

Personnel and kit manufacturers

Managerial changes

Regular season

League table

Positions by round
The table lists the positions of teams after completion of each round.
<div style="overflow:auto">

Results

Playoffs

Copa Princesa de Asturias
The Copa Princesa de Asturias will be played on 27 January 2017, by the two first qualified teams after the end of the first half of the season (round 17).

The Champion of this Cup will play the play-offs as first qualified if it finishes the league between the second and the fifth qualified.

Teams qualified

The game

Stats leaders in regular season

Points

Rebounds

Assists

Performance Index Rating

Awards

MVP by week

References and notes

External links
Official website

 
LEB Oro seasons
LEB2
Spain
Second level Spanish basketball league seasons